Gongrospermum is a monotypic plant genus of Sapindaceae endemic to the Philippines, on Luzon.

It only contains one species: Gongrospermum philippinense.

References

Endemic flora of the Philippines
Flora of Luzon
Critically endangered flora of Asia
Monotypic Sapindaceae genera
Sapindaceae
Taxonomy articles created by Polbot